Henry J. Klosak (November 7, 1925 - December 28, 1992) was an American politician who served as a Republican member of the Illinois House of Representatives and the Village President of Cicero, Illinois.

Klosak was born November 7, 1925. He attended St. Mary's Elementary School and J. S. Morton High School in Cicero. He then attended DePaul University College of Law in Chicago. He served with United States Coast Guard in South Pacific and Africa during World War II. He later became a Justice of the Peace and Magistrate of Circuit Court of Cook County. He was elected in 1966 and served until he became Village President of Cicero in 1980. He was an opponent of the Equal Rights Amendment while in the House. He was married with four children. He died December 28, 1992.

References

United States Coast Guard personnel of World War II
People from Cicero, Illinois
1925 births
1992 deaths
Politicians from Cook County, Illinois
20th-century American politicians
Illinois lawyers
Republican Party members of the Illinois House of Representatives
Mayors of places in Illinois
Military personnel from Illinois
Judges of the Circuit Court of Cook County
20th-century American judges
20th-century American lawyers